Aumakua is a genus of moths of the family Noctuidae, consisting of one species Aumakua omaomao, which is endemic to Hawaii.

Adults are known to fly at dusk.

The larvae feed on Clermontia fauriei and Trematolobelia kauaiensis. They cut the plant (early instars create discs in the leaf, while later instars cut along the edge), thus allowing the latex to drain before consuming the plant material.

References
Natural History Museum Lepidoptera genus database
Aumakua omaomao gen.n., sp.n. (Noctuidae: Cuculliinae) from the Hawaiian Islands is described; the adults, wing venation and genitalia of both sexes are illustrated. The systematic position of Aumakua gen.n. is discussed, its status as a Hawaiian endemism is considered and the habitats of A.omaomao sp.n. are described
Life history images and detailed information

Cuculliinae
Endemic moths of Hawaii